The Irish cricket team toured Australia to play Papua New Guinea from 24 January to 9 February 2016. The tour consisted of a first-class match, three Twenty20 Internationals (T20Is) and a tour match. The first-class match was part of the 2015–17 ICC Intercontinental Cup and the tour match was in preparation of the Intercontinental Cup match. Ireland won the T20I series 2–1.

Squads

Tour match

Two-day match: Queensland XI vs. Ireland

Intercontinental Cup

T20I series

1st T20I

2nd T20I

3rd T20I

References

External links
 Series home at ESPNcricinfo

2016 in Irish cricket
2016 in Papua New Guinean cricket
International cricket competitions in 2015–16
Irish cricket tours of Australia
Papua New Guinean cricket tours of Australia